Statistics of Emperor's Cup in the 1981 season.

Overview
It was contested by 28 teams, and Nippon Kokan won the championship.

Results

1st round
Teijin 1–3 Toyota Motors
Mazda 1–2 Kyushu Sangyo University
Dainichi Cable Industries 0–2 Nippon Steel
Yomiuri 2–0 Osaka University of Commerce
Kawasaki Steel Mizushima 1–3 Matsushita Electric
Waseda University 6–0 Gonohe Town Hall
Fukuoka University 1–4 Doshisha University
Tsukuba University 6–0 YKK
Fujitsu 1–3 Hitachi
Yamaha Motors 1–2 Nissan Motors
Aichi Gakuin University 0–3 Honda
Nippon Kokan 6–1 Fujita Industries

2nd round
Yanmar Diesel 2–1 Toyota Motors
Kyushu Sangyo University 1–3 Nippon Steel
Yomiuri 1–0 Matsushita Electric
Waseda University 0–3 Mitsubishi Motors
Furukawa Electric 11–4 Doshisha University
Tsukuba University 3–1 Hitachi
Nissan Motors 1–2 Honda
Nippon Kokan 2–1 Fujita Industries

Quarterfinals
Yanmar Diesel 1–2 Nippon Steel
Yomiuri 0–0 (PK 7–6) Mitsubishi Motors
Furukawa Electric 1–2 Tsukuba University
Honda 2–4 Nippon Kokan

Semifinals
Nippon Steel 0–0 (PK 3–5) Yomiuri
Tsukuba University 0–1 Nippon Kokan

Final

Yomiuri 0–2 Nippon Kokan
Nippon Kokan won the championship.

References
 NHK

Emperor's Cup
Emperor's Cup
1982 in Japanese football